Ride Through the Country is the debut album released by country rap artist Colt Ford. It was released on December 2, 2008, on the independent Average Joe's label. It features guest appearances by John Michael Montgomery on the title track (which was released as the album lead-off single) as well as an appearance from Jamey Johnson on "Cold Beer".
"Dirt Road Anthem" was later covered by co-writer Brantley Gilbert on his album Halfway to Heaven, and once again by Jason Aldean for his album My Kinda Party, both from 2010.

As of August 6, 2014, the album has sold over 1,000,000 copies in the United States without the benefit of a major radio single.

Critical reception
Matt Bjorke of Roughstock compared the album to a Cowboy Troy album. Bjorke stated "Cowboy Troy's fun music often felt like a novelty, Colt Ford's Ride Through The Country is an underground, indie rap album that recalls southern rapper Bubba Sparxxx."

Track listing

Revisited album 
The album was re-released on five years later as Ride Through the Country (Revisited) on September 30, 2013, with new versions as well the original versions of the hit songs.

Personnel
Kelly Back- electric guitar
Bone Crusher- vocals on "Gangsta of Love"
Gary Burnette- electric guitar
Carmelita Diane Davis- background vocals
Tiffany Davis- background vocals
David Warner Ellis- dobro, fiddle
Colt Ford- lead vocals
Brantley Gilbert- acoustic guitar and vocals on "Dirt Road Anthem"
Kevin "Swine" Grantt- bass guitar
Lindsey Hager- vocals on "Never Thought"
Rob Hajacos- fiddle
Jamey Johnson- vocals on "Cold Beer" and "Saddle Up"
Wayne Killius- drums
Sunny Ledford- vocals on "Waffle House"
Catherine Styron Marx- keyboards, piano
John Michael Montgomery- electric guitar and vocals on "Ride Through the Country"
Anthony Randolph- piano
Scotty Sanders- steel guitar
Paul Scholton- drums
Cory Sellers- background vocals
Michael Spriggs- acoustic guitar
Jason Sylvain- background vocals
Adrian Young- drums

Chart performance

Weekly charts

Year-end charts

Singles

References

2009 debut albums
Colt Ford albums
Average Joes Entertainment albums